The Bandit is a 1996 Turkish film written and directed by Yavuz Turgul and starring Şener Şen and Uğur Yücel.

According to the director the film, which is about a bandit who comes to Istanbul after serving a 35-year jail sentence, "blends fairy tale elements while carrying the notion of reality within a fictional story."

The film is highly popular in Turkey, where it drew in 2½ million viewers and in Germany where it won a Bogey Award. The film is exclusively regarded as the savior and the turning point of Turkish cinema which was desperately struggling against foreign films since the 1980s and having difficulty attracting domestic audiences.

It was Turkey's official entry for the Academy Award for Best Foreign Language Film at the 70th Academy Awards.

Plot
After serving a 35-year jail sentence, Baran (played by Şener Şen), an eşkıya (a bandit, a haydut in Turkish), is released from prison in a town in Eastern Turkey. When returning to the home village he witness the fact that the world has changed dramatically during those years, with the village itself underwater after the construction of a dam. Then he also finds out that the person who masterminded the betrayal that brought him to jail was Berfo (Kamuran Usluer), a friend who had once been closer to him than a brother. In order to snare Keje (Sermin Şen), Baran's sweetheart, Berfo seized his best friend's gold and had Baran arrested by the gendarmes on Mountain Cudi. Then Berfo purchased Keje from her father against her will, and disappeared. According to rumor, he is in Istanbul.

While traveling to Istanbul by train, Baran meets Cumali (Uğur Yücel), a young man. Cumali was raised in the alleys of Beyoğlu, his life revolving around bars, gambling joints, alcohol, dope and women. Cumali dreams of joining the mafia and making it big. He takes Baran to a dilapidated hotel in the backstreets of Beyoğlu. After a while, Cumali and his friends discover that Baran used to be a bandit, but they can't take it seriously. Cumali's dreams of a new life include Emel (Yeşim Salkım), his girlfriend. Emel has a convict brother, Sedat (Özkan Uğur), who is in trouble with the other prisoners in his jail. His life is in danger, and he needs a high amount of money to get out. Cumali promises Emel to get the money for her brother as soon as possible. Thus, when he deals with a transport of drugs for the mafia, he steals a quantity, enough to secure the escaping of Sedat and also later to get him in trouble with Demircan (Melih Çardak), the mafia boss.

Meanwhile, the bandit is going through Istanbul in a daze, lost in a totally alien world, with no idea where to start looking for the woman he loves and the mortal enemy who has stolen her. After some days he happens to see Berfo on TV, now as a powerful businessman with the name changed.

Cast

Şener Şen as Baran
Uğur Yücel as Cumali
Sermin Şen as Keje
Yeşim Salkım as Emel
Kamran Usluer as Berfo
Ülkü Duru as Emel's mother
Özkan Uğur as Sedat
Necdet Mahfi Ayral as Andref Miskin
Kayhan Yıldızoğlu as Artist Kemal
Güven Hokna as Sevim
Kemal İnci as Mustafa
Melih Çardak as Demircan
Settar Tanrıöğen as Girl Naci
Celal Perk as Deli Selim
Ümit Çırak as Cimbom

Reception

Reviews
Sandra Brennan, writing on Allmovie, describes it as a, "lightning-paced, romantic actioner," but ultimately gave the movie only two out of a possible five stars, whilst Rekin Teksoy, writing in Turkish Cinema, states, "Turgul's narrative imbued with sorrow weaves in elements of American action films and television clips," "pays great attention to detail," and, "relies on the tradition of legends found in eastern literature."

Awards
1997 Bogey Awards (Won)
1998 Festróia - Tróia International Film Festival Gold Dolphin: Yavuz Turgul (Won)

See also
 List of submissions to the 70th Academy Awards for Best Foreign Language Film
 List of Turkish submissions for the Academy Award for Best Foreign Language Film

References

External links
 
 
 
 

1996 films
1996 crime drama films
1990s crime action films
Turkish crime action films
Turkish crime drama films
1990s Turkish-language films
Films set in Istanbul
Films set in Turkey
Films about organized crime in Turkey
Turkish films about revenge
Warner Bros. films